Ace Augustine was an American metalcore band from Lancaster, Pennsylvania. The band started making music in 2008, and their membership throughout their tenure has been vocalists, Kyle Irwin, Ben Moser, and Ryan Feister, guitarists, Brian Fellenbaum, Tyler Chadwick, Alex Bolton, and Spencer Barnett, bassist, Cody Owen, drummers, Doug Fellenbaum and Josh Hess, and keyboardist, Brandon Klinger. The band released an independently made extended play, The Glory of Trumpets, in 2009. Their first studio album, The Absolute, was released by Strike First Records, in 2011. The subsequent studio album, The Sick and Suffering, was released by Red Cord Records, in 2013.

History
The band's members have been throughout their tenure vocalists, Kyle Irwin, Ben Moser, and Ryan Feister, guitarists, Brian Fellenbaum, Tyler Chadwick, and Spencer Barnett, bassist, Cody Owen, drummers, Doug Fellenbaum and Josh Hess, and keyboardist, Brandon Klinger.

The band commenced as a musical entity in 2008, with their first release, The Glory of Trumpets, an extended play, that was released independently in 2009. Their first studio album, The Absolute, was released by Strike First Records on January 18, 2011. The subsequent studio album, The Sick and Suffering, was released by Red Cord Records on April 23, 2013.

Members
Current members
 Ryan Feister - lead vocals
 Tyler Chadwick - guitar, vocals
 Spencer Barnett - guitar
 Cody Owen - bass
 Josh Hess - drums
Past members
 Ben Moser - vocals
 Kyle Irwin - vocals
 Alex Bolton - guitar
 Brian Fellenbaum - guitar
 Brandon Klinger - keys
 Doug Fellenbaum - drums

Discography
Studio albums
 The Absolute (January 18, 2011, Strike First)
 The Sick and Suffering (April 23, 2013, Red Cord)
EPs
 The Glory of Trumpets (2009, Independent)

References

External links
Official website

American Christian metal musical groups
Musical groups from Pennsylvania
2008 establishments in Pennsylvania
Musical groups established in 2008
Strike First Records artists